Equestrianism (Spanish: Ecuestre), for the 2013 Bolivarian Games, took place from 21 November to 30 November 2013.

Medal table
Key:

Medalists

References

Events at the 2013 Bolivarian Games
2013 in equestrian
2013 Bolivarian Games